Woods Estate may refer to:
Woods Estate, London (Redbridge)
Woods Estate, West Midlands (Wednesbury)